The 1981–82 Notre Dame Fighting Irish men's basketball team represented the University of Notre Dame during the 1981–82 NCAA Division I men's basketball season. The team was coached by Digger Phelps and was ranked in the Associated Press poll for the entirety of the season. The Fighting Irish finished the regular season with a record of 10–17.

Guard Mike Mitchell was the team's captain and leading scorer, averaging 6.4 points per game.

Roster

Schedule

Players selected in NBA drafts

References 

Notre Dame Fighting Irish
Notre Dame Fighting Irish
Notre Dame
Notre Dame Fighting Irish men's basketball seasons